Song of the Birds or The Song of the Birds may refer to:

Film
 The Song of the Birds, a 1935 cartoon
 Song of the Birds (1949 film), a Noveltoons remake with Little Audrey

Literature
 Song of the Birds (book), a 1985 collection of sayings, stories, and impressions of Pablo Casals by Julian Lloyd Webber
 The Song of the Birds; or Analogies of Animal and Spiritual Life, an 1845 book by William Evans
 Il Canto degl'Augelli (Italian, 'The song of the birds'), a 1601 book by Antonio Valli da Todi
 Shirat ha-Tziporim (Hebrew, 'The Song of the Birds'), a 1985 work of poetry by Maya Bejerano

Music
 "El cant dels ocells" (Catalan, 'Song of the Birds'), a traditional Christmas song and lullaby
 Cant dels Ocells (Catalan, 'Song of the Birds'), instrumental arrangement by Pablo Casals of the traditional song (composition for cello and organ)
 The Song of the Birds, a 1951 cello concerto by Herbert Murrill 
 Song of the Birds, a piano composition by Carl Heins
 Song of the Birds, a composition by Gregory Short
 Le chant des oiseaux (French, 'The Song of the Birds'), a c. 1528 composition by Clément Janequin
 Tori no Uta (Japanese: 鳥の歌, 'Song of the Birds'), a 2009 CD by Cocco

See also 

 Birdsong (disambiguation)